Requin, shark in French (pl : requins), may refer to :

Places
 Great Requin River, a river of Grenada
 Little Requin River, a river of Grenada

People
 Édouard Réquin (1879–1953), French soldier
 Steve Requin (born 1968), a Canadian cartoonist from Québec
 Michèle Bernard-Requin (1943–2019), French lawyer and magistrate
 Abderrahim Chafay (born 1977; stagename Requin), Moroccan-French Muay Thai kickboxer.

Ships
 French ship Requin, a French Navy shipname
 Requin-class submarine, a class of submarines of French navy in the mid-1920s
 French submarine Requin (1924)
 USS Requin (SS-481), a United States Navy Tench-class submarine
 a French submarine seized by Italy during World War II and converted into a cargo submarine
  − brig of the French Navy launched in 1794 that the British Royal Navy captured in 1795 and that was wrecked in 1801.

Entertainment
 The Shark (1930 film), French film originally released as Le Requin
 The Requin (film), 2022 U.S. film

Other uses
 Requins de l'Atlantique FC, a football club of Benin playing in the town of Cotonou

See also

 
 Shark (disambiguation)
 Quin (disambiguation)
 RE (disambiguation)